Links of Justice is a 1958 British film.

Plot
Edgar Mills and his mistress Stella plot to murder Edgar's wealthy wife Clare. But best laid go awry, and Edgar ends up dead. Clare becomes prime suspect, but is able to prove she acted in self-defence when a burglar who witnessed the crime comes forward.

Cast
Edgar Mills - 	Jack Watling
Clare Mills - 	Sarah Lawson
Defence Counsel - 	Robert Raikes
Prosecuting Counsel - 	Denis Shaw
Stella	- Kay Callard
Edward Manning - 	Geoffrey Hibbert
Jemima Vance, Theatrical Costumier - 	Totti Truman Taylor

Critical reception
Allmovie wrote, "Chalk up another serviceable second-feature British melodrama for the production team of Edward and Harry Danzinger."

References

External links

1958 films
British drama films
1950s English-language films
1950s British films